Tennfjord is a village that is located at the end of the Grytafjorden in Ålesund Municipality in Møre og Romsdal county, Norway. The village of Tennfjord lies just south of the villages of Eidsvik and Vatne. Eidsvik lies in the northeastern part of the fjord valley, while Tennfjord lies to the south. More than 900 inhabitants live in the Tennfjord area. The town has its own male voice choir: Tennfjord Mannskor.

References

Ålesund
Villages in Møre og Romsdal